Jagannath or Jagannatha is a  deity worshipped in  Hinduism and Buddhism. 

Jagannath or Jagannatha may also refer to:

People 
 Jagannatha Samrat (1652–1744), Indian astronomer and mathematician
 Jagannatha Panditaraja, 17th-century poet and literary critic
 Jagannath Acharya, Nepalese politician
 Jagannath Azad (1918–2004), Indian poet
 Jagan Nath Kaul (1924–2008), Indian humanitarian
 Jagannath Mishra (21st century), Indian politician
 Jagannath Pahadia (1932–2021), Indian National Congress politician
 Jagannath Sami (21st century), Indo-Fijian soccer player
 Jagannath Shankar Shet (1800–1865), Indian activist
 Jagannath Shankarsett (1800–1865), Indian philanthropist and educationalist
 Manda Jagannath (born 1951), Indian politician

Other uses
 Jagannath University, a public university of Bangladesh
 Jagannath, Nepal (disambiguation), multiple locations
 Jagannath, a short-story collection by Karin Tidbeck
 Jagannath, Bheri, Nepal
 Jagannath, Seti, Nepal
 Sri Jagannath (film), a 1950 Indian Oriya film directed by Chitta Ranjan Mitra

See also
 Jagannath Temple (disambiguation)
 Juggernaut (disambiguation)